An American in Toledo (Spanish: Un americano en Toledo) is a 1960 Spanish comedy film directed by Carlos Arévalo and José Luis Monter and starring Silvia Morgan and Georges Rivière.

Cast
In alphabetical order
 Ángel Arrabal
 Matilde Artero 
 Ángel Calero
 Juan Calvo as Comisario  
 María Cañete  
 Concha Cañizares 
 María Cofán
 Manuel Flores
 Francisco Antonio Gómez  
 Guillermo Hidalgo
 José Isbert as Román  
 Amy Márquez
 Antonio Molino Rojo 
 Mario Moreno  
 Silvia Morgan as María  
 Pinky Prindle  
 Georges Rivière as Arthur  
 Elías Rodríguez

References

Bibliography 
 Jesús García Rodrigo. José Isbert, en el recuerdo de Albacete. Diputación de Albacete, 1998.

External links 
 

1960 comedy films
Spanish comedy films
1960 films
1960s Spanish-language films
Films directed by Carlos Arévalo
Films scored by Augusto Algueró
1960s Spanish films
Films set in Toledo, Spain